Margh or Morgh may refer to:
 Morgh-e Bozorg, Fars Province
 Morgh-e Kuchak, Fars Province
 Margh, Isfahan
 Margh, Borkhar, Isfahan Province
 Margh, Golpayegan, Isfahan Province
 Margh, Markazi
 Margh, South Khorasan